Thulani Innocent Ngcepe (born 19 January 1990 in Tsakane) is a South African football (soccer) striker.

On 14 January 2007, he became the youngest player ever to score a goal in the SA Premier League after scoring on his debut against Silver Stars.

References

External links

Player's profile at absapremiership.co.za

1990 births
Living people
South African soccer players
Association football forwards
Moroka Swallows F.C. players
SuperSport United F.C. players
Royal Eagles F.C. players
Bidvest Wits F.C. players
South African Premier Division players